The New Brunswick Free Public Library is the public library of New Brunswick, New Jersey. The main library, built 1903, is located at 60 Livingston Avenue and is one of New Jersey's Carnegie libraries. The Henry Guest House was moved to library grounds in 1924 and is bordered by the Willow Grove Cemetery. It is a contributing property of the Livingston Avenue Historic District. The library is the only building with Beaux Arts style in the district.

Gallery

See also
List of Carnegie libraries in New Jersey
National Register of Historic Places listings in Middlesex County, New Jersey

References

External links 
 
 

Buildings and structures in New Brunswick, New Jersey
Tourist attractions in New Brunswick, New Jersey
Carnegie libraries in New Jersey
Historic district contributing properties in New Jersey
National Register of Historic Places in Middlesex County, New Jersey
Library buildings completed in 1903
Beaux-Arts architecture in New Jersey